Jane McAdam Freud  (24 February 1958 – 9 August 2022) was a British conceptual sculptor working in installation art and digital media. She was the winner of the 2014 European Trebbia Awards for artistic achievement.

Life and work 
McAdam Freud was born in London to Katherine Margaret McAdam and Lucian Freud, and was the great-granddaughter of Sigmund Freud. Her career began with a solo show at the age of 18, curated by her art teachers at Putney College, which is now part of South Thames College. After completing a Foundation course at Wimbledon College of Art, McAdam Freud studied Mosaics in Ravenna from 1977 to 1978, returning to London to study at the Central School of Art and Design and at the Royal College of Art under the supervision of John Stezaker and Eduardo Paolozzi.

In 1986 McAdam Freud won the British Art Medal Scholarship in Rome where she studied sculpture at the Accademia di Belle Arti di Roma under Gino Marotta and at the Scuola d'Arte della Medaglia in Rome. McAdam Freud was an associate lecturer at Central Saint Martins and taught short courses in the Sculpture School at Morley College. She has also taught at the Royal College of Art, London and at the Royal Academy of Fine Arts, Antwerp.

McAdam Freud was a Fellow of the Royal British Society of Sculptors. In 1991 she was awarded the Italian State Mint prize for her work Moments and Memories.  Her winning design was put into production by the Istituto Poligrafico e Zecca dello Stato. In the same year she was granted the Freedom of the City of London. She has published several catalogues including; On the Edge 1996, Relative Relations 2006  and numerous papers on Art and Psychoanalysis.

McAdam Freud's short film Dead or Alive refers to Freud's concept of Condensation. The pairings morph into each other through the merging back and forth of Freud's antiquities with her sculpture, from past to present ‘virtually’ closing the gap of time. Great similarities can be found in the forms and motifs of the pairs. At a midway point the two objects merge and form a third image of a ‘virtual’ object. Her preference for this work was to locate it within reach of a psychoanalytically aware audience. Dead or Alive was shown internationally at museums, institutes and galleries including Philoctetes Centre for the Imagination, NY, New York USA in 2008, Lung Yingtai Cultural Foundation, (Media Tek Lectures) Taipei, Taiwan and the Kosciuszko Foundation, NYC, USA in 2009. Also the Sundaram Tagore Gallery, LA, USA in 2010 and Whitelabs Gallery, Milan in 2012.

Her works are represented in both national and international public collections including the British Museum, the Victoria and Albert Museum, National Gallery Archives, London, the Ashmolean Museum, Oxford and the Fitzwilliam Museum, Cambridge. International collections include the Brooklyn Museum, The National Arts Club, Carnegie Museums of Pittsburgh, the Greek National Gallery, and the Berlin State Museums.

McAdam Freud lived in northwest London at the time of her death, and was married to architect Peter Henson. She died on 9 August 2022, aged 64; no cause was given.

Solo exhibitions 
 1996: Yorkshire Museum, York
 1997: Fitzwilliam Museum, Cambridge
 1997: Hunterian Museum, Glasgow, Scotland
 1998: Simmons Gallery, Bloomsbury, London
 1998: Marishal Museum, Aberdeen, Scotland
 1999: Forum for Contemporary Art, St. Louis, Missouri, USA
 2000: Das Norske Veritas, London Bridge
 2001: 'Resonating' The Gallery, University College Cork
 2004: 'Give and Take' Ashmolean Museum, Oxford
 2006: 'We Do' Adele Boag Gallery, Adelaide, Australia
 2006: 'Relative Relations' Freud Museum
 2006: 'Subject as Object' Beverley Knowles Fine Art, London
 2007: 'Relative Relations' Harrow Museum, London
 2007: 'Relative Reflections' Muzeum Novojičínska, Pribor, Czech Republic
 2009: 'Repetitions' New York Psychoanalytic Society, NYC, USA
 2009: 'Other Side' Harrow and Wembley Progressive Synagogue
 2009: 'Repetitions' Kosciuszko Foundation NYC, USA
 2009–10: 'Conceptual Sculpture' London Centre for Psychotherapy
 2010: 'StoneSpeak' Freud Museum, London
 2010: 'Freud on Freud' New Center of Psychoanalysis in LA, USA
 2010: 'Random' Sundaram Tagore Gallery, LA, USA
 2010: 'War Works' Centre for Jewish Culture, Kraków, Poland
 2011: 'Random Plus' Sundaram Tagore Gallery, New York
 2011: 'Hinged' Freud Museum of Dreams, St. Petersburg, Russia/
 2011: 'HiStory' Austria General Consulate Gallery, Cracow, Poland
 2012: 'Lucian Freud My Father' Freud Museum, London.
 2012: 'Family Matters' Gazelli Art House, London, UK
 2012: 'Flesh and Stone' New School House Gallery, York, UK
 2012: '3 Generations' Whitelabs Gallery, Milan, Italy
 2013: 'Family Matters' Gazelli Art House, Baku, Azerbaijan
 2013: 'Taking Care' Palazzo Tagliaferro, Andora, Italy
 2013: 'Dreaming and Doing' Pushkin Museum of Fine Art, Moscow
 2014: 'Painted Earth' Harrow Arts Centre, London
 2014: 'In My Own Image – Ill Fit' British Psychotherapy Foundation, London
 2014: (May,Jun) 'In the Mould of the Fathers' C2 Contemporanea,Florence, Italy
 2014: 'On Identity', Gallery Martini Ronchetti, Genoa, Italy
 2014: 'Parallels' 2 man show with photographer Frank Dabba Smith at The Priory, Roehampton, London
 2014: 'Dance of Disapproval' Anna Pavlova House, London
 2015: 'Mother Mould', Gazelli Art House, Mayfair, London
 2015–16: Wooyang Art Museum, Gyeongju-si, South Korea Retrospective
 2017: TIMH, NY Psychoanalytic Association – small works display
 2017: 'Object Authority' Pasmore Gallery, Harrow School, London
 2017: 'Recent works', C2 Contemporary – Di Pinto, Florence, Italy
 2017: Societe Psychanalytique de Paris, Lyon, France, exhibition and presentation
 2017: Symposium and Exhibition with works by Claudio Costa, Silesiun Uni. of Mestre, Vencice, Italy
 2017: Museum of Modern Art, Ascona, Lugano, Switzerland – Group exhibition
 2017–18: 'Object' Fix Me in Your Turquoise Gaze', Gazelli Art House, London
 2017–18: 'Freud Study Merge', CE Contemporary, Milan, Italy
 2018: Jekza Gallery, Timișoara, Romania
 2018: Oradea City Museum, Oradea, Romania
 2019: Palazzo Tagliaferro, Andora, Italy
 2019: Palazzo Ducale, Genoa, Italy
 2019: Museo Attivoa Claudia Costa, Quarto, Genoa, Italy
 2019: Spatui Intact, Cluj, Romania
 2020: Headstone Manor Museum, Harrow, London
 2020: Gazelli Art House, Baku, Azerbaijan
 2021–22: Installation, Freud Birth House, Pribor, CZ

The most recent screening venues are·· the Wooyang Museum of Contemporary Art in 2015–16 and at NYU, New York USA in March 2017.

Screening venues include 
 2006: Freud Museum, London
 2007: Harrow Museum, London
 2007: German Psychoanalytic Society, Berlin
 2007: Florence Biennale, Italy
 2007: Muzeum Novojicinska, Pribor, Czech Republic
 2007: Waterstones Bookstore, Harrow on the Hill, London
 2008: Royal College of Art Cross Currents #3 event
 2008: Fourth International Symposium Psychoanalysis and Art, Florence, Italy
 2008: Philoctetes Centre for the Imagination, NY, New York USA
 2009: NYSPI New York Psychoanalytic Society, New York, NY, USA
 2009: Medailia Rack and Hamper Gallery, NY, New York USA
 2009: Lung Yingtai Cultural Foundation, (Media Tek Lectures) Taipei, Taiwan
 2009: Shifan University, Kaohsiung, South Taiwan Org. by the Goethe Institute, Taipei
 2009: Kosciuszko Foundation, NYC, USA
 2009: National Arts Club, NYC, USA
 2010: New Center for Psychoanalysis in LA, USA
 2010: Sundaram Tagore Gallery, LA, USA
 2011: Sundaram Tagore Gallery, NY, USA
 2011: Psycause Conference, Pribor, Czech Republic
 2012: Three Generations, Milan, Italy
 2013: Family Matters, Gazelli Art House, Baku, Azerbaijan
 2014: On Identity, Gallery Martini Ronchetti, Genoa, Italy,
 2015–16: Wooyang Art Museum, Gyeongju-si, South Korea Retrospective
 2017: C2 Contemporary – Di Pinto, Florence, Italy
 2017: Human, German Embassy, Belgravia, London
 2017: Societe Psychanalytique de Paris, Lyon, France,
 2017. Museum of Modern Art, Ascona, Lugano, Switzerland
 2017: Freud Study Merge, CE Contemporary, Milan
 2018: IEA Institute for Expressive Analysis, NY, USA
 2021–22: Freud Birth House, Pribor, CZ

See also 
 Freud family

References

External links 
 
 Royal British Society of Sculptors

1958 births
2022 deaths
20th-century English women artists
21st-century English women artists
Academics of Central Saint Martins
Alumni of the Central School of Art and Design
English people of German-Jewish descent
Jane McAdam
Place of death missing
Sculptors from London